The Federal Protective Service (FPS) is a Federal Law Enforcement agency of the United States Department of Homeland Security (DHS). It is also "the federal agency charged with protecting and delivering integrated law enforcement and security services to facilities owned or leased by the General Services Administration (GSA)"—over 9,000 buildings—and their occupants.

FPS is a federal law enforcement agency which employs approximately 900 law enforcement officers who receive their initial training at the Federal Law Enforcement Training Center (FLETC). FPS provides integrated law enforcement and security services to U.S. federal buildings, courthouses, and other properties administered by the General Services Administration (GSA) and the U.S. Department of Homeland Security (DHS).

In support of their mission, FPS contracts with private security firms to provide a further 13,000 armed protective security officers (PSO) providing access control and security response within federal buildings. These PSOs are not federal law enforcement officers but private security employees trained by FPS.  FPS also protects non-GSA properties as authorized and carries out various other activities for the promotion of homeland security as the Secretary of Homeland Security may prescribe, to include providing a uniformed police response to National Security Special Events, and national disasters. 

The FPS was a part of the Immigration and Customs Enforcement until October 2009, when it was transferred to the National Protection and Programs Directorate. As part of the NPPD's transformation into the Cybersecurity and Infrastructure Security Agency (CISA), the FPS was further moved to the Department's Management Directorate.

Description
The Federal Protective Service is a branch of the Management Directorate and a component of the U.S. Department of Homeland Security (DHS). Functioning as the police force of the Secretary of Homeland Security. The FPS is responsible for policing, securing and ensuring a safe environment in which federal agencies can conduct their business. The Service does this by investigating threats posed against over 9,000 federal facilities nationwide and has personnel deployed at 2,300 of them.

The FPS's work focuses directly on the interior security of the nation and the reduction of crimes and potential threats to federal facilities throughout the nation. Uniformed FPS officers/inspectors and special agents respond to calls for assistance, conduct investigations and provide crime prevention tips, as well as assist in emergency planning by the departments and agencies occupying the buildings for which the agency is responsible.

All federal facilities under FPS control receive a thorough building security assessment on a recurring schedule. During this assessment representatives of all agencies in the facility are interviewed to gather information on the specific mission they perform within the facility, and intelligence and crime statistics for the area are reviewed, as are existing security countermeasures. Based on the findings and working with the agencies housed in the facility, security countermeasures are added or adjusted. This allows for tailored security for each individual facility versus a one-size-fits-all approach.

Role

Primary Protective Services
 Conducting Facility Security Assessments
 Designing countermeasures for tenant agencies
 Maintaining uniformed law enforcement presence
 Maintaining armed contract security guards
 Performing background suitability checks for contract employees
 Monitoring security alarms via centralized communication centers

Additional Protective Services
 Conducting criminal investigations
 Sharing intelligence among local/state/federal agencies
 Protecting special events
 Working with FEMA to respond to natural disasters
 Offering special operations including K-9 explosive detection
 Training federal tenants in crime prevention and Occupant Emergency Planning

Training
Newly hired sworn FPS law enforcement personnel attended Uniform Police Training Program for 13 weeks, followed by FPS add on training for an additional 13 weeks at the Federal Law Enforcement Training Center location in Glynco, Georgia. Furthermore, following graduation, new FPS law enforcement officers undergo additional post academy training, as well as career-continuous training, and are assigned to an FPS office in one of eleven regions throughout the country. FPS law enforcement officers also undergo additional training, depending on their assignment to special units within the service.

History

The origins of FPS date to 1790 (a year after the US Marshals Service), with the enactment of the Residence Act, authorizing President George Washington to appoint three commissioners to create a federal territory for a permanent seat of federal government. Prior to the formal establishment of Washington & the District of Columbia, commissioners hired six night watchmen to protect designated buildings the government was intended to occupy. FPS traces its origins to the appointment of these six night watchmen.

FPS has resided in a number of different agencies over the years. The act of June 1, 1948, authorized the Federal Administrator to appoint special policemen for duty in connection with the policing of all buildings owned and occupied by the United States. In 1949, Congress enacted the Federal Property and Administrative Services Act of 1949, which consolidated real property functions within the newly created General Services Administration (GSA). The FPS force, known at the time as the United States Special Police, came under the supervision of the Protection Division of the Public Building Service (PBS). In 1971, the Administrator of GSA signed an order formally establishing the Federal Protective Force, later known as FPS, and the Civil Service Commission authorized the special classification title of Federal Protective Officer (FPO).

Initially, the main function of FPS was protection, as an integral part of building operations. For the most part, the force held fixed posts and performed duties that would be considered safety functions today, such as: eliminating fire and safety hazards, patrolling buildings, detecting fires, and providing the first line of defense in fighting fires; and answering visitor questions, assisting citizens, rendering first aid, and directing traffic when necessary. By 1960, the mission of FPS had become the first line of defense against bomb threats, bombings, vandalism, mass demonstrations, and violence against Federal buildings.

In 1980, Fidel Castro instigated a wave of emigration from Cuba to the United States using the harbor town of Mariel for debarkation. The thousands of refugees were eventually distributed to military installations in several states (Fort Chaffee, AR, Fort McCoy, WI, Fort Indiantown Gap, PA) and Puerto Rico to await permanent resettlement. The Immigration and Naturalization Service and Border Patrol were understaffed to provide civilian law enforcement officers needed to maintain order within the installations. The Federal Protective Service, then administratively placed under the General Service Administration's Public Building Service, was among several federal authorities asked to provide additional on-site officers for the duration of the event. Federal Protective Officers from across the country frequently served in the camps, and also during the riot at Fort Chaffee.

More recently, the role of the FPS officer has undergone further changes. The FPS has shifted its emphasis from the fixed guard post concept of security to a mobile police patrol and response. FPS contracts private security companies to guard fixed posts. FPS officers perform all duties attendant to the normal interpretation of a police officer function including maintaining law and order, preventing or deterring disturbances, and investigating both felonies and misdemeanors. The Civil Service Commission developed standards for FPS applicants, which included background investigations, and physical examinations.

On August 28, 1996, the Federal Protective Service arrested Civil Rights Movement historian Randy Kryn and 10 others who were protesting in a demonstration at the Kluczynski Federal Building in downtown Chicago during that year's Democratic National Convention.

21st century
Pursuant to the Homeland Security Act of 2002, FPS was transferred to the Department of Homeland Security and retained its responsibilities for protecting the buildings, grounds, and property owned, occupied, or secured by the federal government under GSA's jurisdiction. In addition to GSA facilities, the Act also provides FPS with the authority to protect properties held by DHS components that were not under GSA jurisdiction. FPS was moved from GSA, Public Building Services, to DHS, effective March 1, 2003. Within DHS, FPS became a part of U.S. Immigration and Customs Enforcement (ICE). On October 28, 2009, President Barack Obama signed legislation that transferred FPS from ICE to the National Protection and Programs Directorate (NPPD) of the U.S. Department of Homeland Security. Today, FPS is responsible for policing, securing, and ensuring a safe environment in which federal agencies can conduct business by reducing threats posed against approximately 9,000 Federal government facilities throughout the United States.

On December 26, 2007, President George W. Bush signed H.R. 2764 Omnibus spending bill into law which included a provision that FPS maintains, by July 31, 2008, not fewer than 1,200 full-time staff and 900 full-time Police Officers, Inspectors, and Special Agents who, while working, are directly engaged on a daily basis protecting and enforcing laws at Federal buildings. This amendment to H.R. 2674 was introduced by Senator Hillary Rodham Clinton and was successfully included in the bill and signed into law largely due to the efforts of the American Federation of Government Employees Local 918-FPS and the grassroots efforts of its membership.

In March 2008, Del. Eleanor Holmes Norton, chair of the responsible House of Representatives subcommittee, said, "We're seeing the near collapse of the Federal Protective Service". A GAO report, which included incidents that occurred before H.R. 2764 passed, documented lapses that had occurred on federal government property, including the theft of a trailer of surveillance equipment from an FBI parking deck. A GAO investigator said that budget cuts were causing reduced effectiveness. The service has seen its budget and staff cut since it became a part of the Department of Homeland Security in March 2003.

In 2009, the Government Accountability Office (GAO) and the Inspector General for the Department of Homeland Security issued reports that were highly critical of the Federal Protective Service for relying on low-wage contract personnel to provide security at federal buildings.  See GAO-09-0859T  and OIG-09-51.  Both documented that the contractors lacked the necessary skills or training to handle their duties, which threatened the security of all federal employees and visitors.  The GAO report made national headlines in July 2009 as it cited frequent lapses, including failure to prevent investigators from carrying weapons into several key federal installations.  It also displayed a photograph of a contract security guard asleep at his guard post.

On October 28, 2009, U.S. President Barack Obama, signed legislation which effectively transferred the Federal Protective Service from the U.S. Immigration and Customs Enforcement to the National Protection and Programs Directorate of the Department of Homeland Security.

On June 17, 2019, a lone gunman by the name of Brian Issack Clyde opened fire on the Earle Cabell Federal Building and Courthouse in Dallas, Texas. Since FPS officers are charged with protecting federal courthouses, they were present at the shooting. Three FPS officers engaged the shooter, fatally wounding him.

On May 30, 2020, Dave Patrick Underwood, a contract security officer for the Federal Protective Service, was shot and killed in Oakland, California. The attack occurred amid the George Floyd protests, which broke out into unrest in Oakland. Two suspects, one of whom had killed a Santa Cruz County deputy in a subsequent attack on police, were arrested in June; they were found to have had ties to the far-right boogaloo movement.

Starting in July 2020, the Federal Protective Service was the main agency involved in the deployment of federal forces to the city of Portland, Oregon. These forces included many officers from other agencies, but they acted under the jurisdiction of FPS. Their operations centered around the two downtown Portland federal buildings on 3rd Ave, and the ICE building in South Waterfront.

Jurisdiction
FPS law enforcement personnel derive their law enforcement authority from Section 1315 of Title 40 of the United States Code (40 USC 1315):

Labor organization
The American Federation of Government Employees (AFGE) National Local 918 is the exclusive representative of all bargaining unit eligible Federal Protective Service employees which include non-supervisory Police Officers, Inspectors, Special Agents and support personnel. Citation: AFGE NL#918

Protective Investigations Program

The Protective Investigations Program was established in early 2004, to ensure the safety of DHS and FPS protectees and facilities. The objective of the program is to prevent an attack on persons and facilities designated as FPS protectees.

The program integrates the following aspects of the FPS mission: the initial patrol response by FPS uniformed police officers; full investigation by FPS special agents; prosecution by the U.S. Attorney's Office or State Prosecutor's Office; physical security enhancements and countermeasures; security briefings and workplace violence seminars administered by FPS law enforcement personnel; suspicious surveillance detection initiatives designed to detect pre-incident indicators of threats to federal employees, facilities and protectees; a monthly Operations Security Bulletin; and protection details for high-ranking officials within DHS. FPS Headquarters developed a Memorandum of Understanding, in collaboration with the U.S. Capitol Police, enabling the two entities to use each other's resources to effectively, efficiently and professionally respond to and investigate threats and inappropriate communications directed at members of Congress, their families and staff when outside the Washington, D.C., metropolitan area.

FPS collaborates with other components within DHS and has established liaisons with agencies having a protective and investigative mission such as the U.S. Secret Service—National Threat Assessment Center, Social Security Administration (SSA), U.S. Marshals Service, FBI, U.S. Postal Inspection Service and various state and local police agencies throughout the country.

FPS special agents have made arrests and conducted investigations of subjects charged with making inappropriate communications and threats to members of the U.S. Congress (House and Senate) and/or their staff, the director of Federal Emergency Management Agency, FPS Director, members of the military reserve, SSA, the Department of Veteran Affairs and other federal employees. Many of these investigations resulted in convictions for making threats to do physical harm and threats to bomb federal facilities. FPS special agents investigated threats delivered in person, via telephone, e-mail and U.S. Postal Service mail.

FPS special agents also oversee an outreach program designed to educate the community and tenant agencies and provide them with a point of contact to report suspicious behavior and incidents that threaten FPS protectees, facilities, and/or visitors.

Explosive Detection Dog Teams
The mission of the Explosive Detector Dog (EDD) Teams is the protection of life and property and providing a strong visible and psychological deterrent against criminal and terrorist acts. Prior to the terrorist attacks of September 11, 2001, the FPS had a minimal program of 10 EDD Teams located in the Washington, D.C., metropolitan area. Since that time, the FPS EDD program has expanded to more than 60 teams nationwide.

The EDD Teams conduct routine explosive searches of office areas, vehicles, materials, packages and persons housed in federally owned or leased facilities. The EDD Teams respond to bomb threats and suspicious packages or items and are used to assist in clearing identified areas.

Deployment
The FPS EDD Teams are deployed in their area of assignment as well as frequent deployment to National Special Security Events such as the Olympic games, the Republican and Democratic National Conventions, and the G-8 Summit. The EDD Teams provide their vital capabilities to state and local law enforcement authorities under emergency conditions when local EDD Teams are unavailable.

Training
The FPS Canine Training Academy is located in Fort McClellan, Alabama, and is conducted in partnership with the Auburn University Canine Detection Training Center. Each handler and respective canine attends the mandatory 10-week EDD Handler Training Course. The handlers and their canine partners graduate from the course as a team.

The EDD Teams are on call 24 hours a day and serve a crucial role as part of a greater network of first responders in a growing national network of federal task force officers.

Hazardous Response Program
The FPS Hazardous Response Program (HRP) was created to support the mission of FPS in response to credible chemical, biological, radiological, nuclear and high yield explosive (CBRNE) threats or incidents.

HRP includes initial investigations of suspicious or threatening CBRNE incidents; completion of CBRNE threat assessments; confirmations of unauthorized presence of CBRNE agents and materials; and the conduction of emergency operations. HRP also provides: evacuation support during CBRNE incidents and some training assistance. The program is compliant with OSHA and NFPA guidance and regulations. The HRP consists of five main elements: Awareness, Prevention, Preparedness, Response, and Recovery.

Mega Centers
In 2000, FPS transitioned all alarm monitoring and dispatching capabilities from several regional control centers to four MegaCenters. Currently, each MegaCenter monitors multiple types of alarm systems, closed-circuit television, and wireless dispatch communications within federal facilities throughout the entire nation. The centers located in Battle Creek, Michigan; Denver, Colorado; Philadelphia, Pennsylvania; and Suitland, Maryland, are equipped with state-of-the-art communication systems and in operation 24 hours a day, 7 days a week.

See also

 Federal law enforcement in the United States
 United States Border Patrol
 Federal Bureau of Investigation
 FBI Police
 U.S. Diplomatic Security Service
 U.S. Customs and Border Protection
 U.S. Immigration and Customs Enforcement
 U.S. Marshals Service

References

External links

Official:

 Official page
 U.S. Department of Homeland Security
 Federal Protective Service webpage
 Federal Protective Service Mega Centers
 Federal Protective Service Explosive Detection Dog Program
 Federal Protective Service Hazardous Response Program
 Federal Protective Service Mobile Command Posts
 Federal Protective Service Protective Investigations Program
Others:
 American Federation of Government Employees (AFGE) Local 918, the exclusive representative of all FPS bargaining unit employees nationwide.

1971 establishments in Washington, D.C.
Government agencies established in 1971
Law enforcement agencies of the District of Columbia
Protective security units
Organizations based in Washington, D.C.
United States Department of Homeland Security